Lugard may refer to:
Edward Lugard, British army officer.
Sir Frederick Lugard, 1st Baron Lugard, British colonial bureaucrat and military officer.
Lugard Footbridge, in Kaduna, Nigeria, named after Baron Lugard.
Lugard Road, one of many places in Hong Kong named after Baron Lugard.
, a Uganda Railway paddle steamer named after Baron Lugard and built in 1927.
, a Kenya and Uganda Railways and Harbours paddle steamer named after Baron Lugard and built in 1946.
Lugard is also the capital city of Murandy in the Wheel of Time series of novels by Robert Jordan.